Frederick William Earp was a footballer who played for Nottingham Forest between 1878 and 1885 and then went on to manage the club. He was the elder brother of Martin (Jack) Earp who also played for the club.

Earp appeared for the North in a North v South representative match on 6 March 1880 at The Oval.

The 1879 Football Annual described Earp as a very pretty and effective wing player, dribbles with great skill and very difficult to remove from the ball.

Fred Earp played for the Forest team that won the Wednesbury Cup on 19 May 1883.

Earp was Manager of Nottingham Forest between 1909 and 1912.

Career statistics

As a Player

Fred Earp also played in numerous Friendlies including the Wednesbury Cup and the Notts County Cup. There was no league at the time to play in.

As a Manager

References

English footballers
1860 births
1948 deaths
English football managers
Nottingham Forest F.C. players
Nottingham Forest F.C. managers
Association football wingers